Martín Dedyn (born 7 May 1988) is an Argentine footballer who played in the Primera B Nacional.

References

1988 births
Living people
Argentine footballers
Association football midfielders
Argentine expatriate footballers
Expatriate footballers in Albania
Argentine expatriate sportspeople in Albania
Kategoria Superiore players
KF Tërbuni Pukë players
Footballers from Buenos Aires